The following is a list of the provinces of South Africa ranked by highest point in elevation.

List

References
 
 

Highest point
South Africa